Captain Stingaree is a supervillain in the DC Comics universe, and a minor foe of Batman. He first appeared in Detective Comics #460 (June 1976), and was created by Bob Rozakis, Michael Uslan and Ernie Chan.

Name
In his memoir The Boy Who Loved Batman, Uslan says that he and Rozakis were excited to create a pirate-themed villain for Batman, but disappointed by the name that editor Julius Schwartz gave the character: "Bob said it was the name of some old movie about a notorious highwayman played by Richard Dix or Fort Dix or some old actor. I hated the name Stingaree. Bob hated the name Stingaree. But Julie liked it, and so it came to pass".

Fictional character biography
Born one of a set of quadruplets, Karl Courtney was always the black sheep of the family. Donning a cutlass and pirate outfit, Karl becomes Captain Stingaree. In his first outing, Captain Stingaree attempts to uncover Batman's secret identity. Somehow Stingaree has become convinced that his three brothers are actually Batman. Batman approaches the Courtney brothers, asking them to pose as Batman and act as bait for Stingaree. This allows the real Batman and the Flash to capture Captain Stingaree.

In Secret Society of Super-Villains #6 (April 1977), Captain Stingaree joins the Society. Teaming up with Captain Cold and  Captain Boomerang I, the three captains went on a crime spree kidnapping other captains to show supremacy over air, land and sea, before they are taken down by Captain Comet and Black Canary II.

In Detective Comics #526, Captain Stingaree meets at an old theater with other Bat-Villains. Talia is branded a traitor. While Talia escapes, Captain Stingaree is accidentally frozen by Mr. Freeze. This is his last pre-Crisis appearance.

Post-Crisis
In Justice League of America #2 (November 2006), it is revealed that Captain Stingaree is gay, and is in a secret relationship with the Cavalier (Mortimer Drake).  Black Lightning uses this fact to leverage information out of the closeted Cavalier. Both Captain Stingaree and Cavalier are killed during a fight with the Secret Six (although Cavalier, whose back was broken by Bane, may have survived).

DC Rebirth
In the DC Rebirth reboot, Karl is played as somewhat of a joke villain. He is portrayed as a man who assumes the identity of Stingaree when not under the influence of his medication. He attempts to murder several people who clearly know him and are dressed as the Batman. They plead with him to go back on his medication, but he says that they will not "deceive him again". He is stopped by the real Batman and "Gotham Girl" before anyone is seriously injured.

Powers and abilities
Captain Stingaree has no superpowers but is a skilled swordsman.

See also
 List of Batman family enemies

References

External links
Cosmic Teams: Captain Stingaree
 Secret Society of Super-Villains #6

DC Comics LGBT supervillains
DC Comics supervillains
Fictional pirates
Fictional swordfighters in comics
Fictional gay males
Comics characters introduced in 1976

de:Schurken im Batman-Universum#Captain Stingaree